Davit Oniashvili (22 December 1883 — 14 July 1937) was a Georgian politician, active in the Democratic Republic of Georgia. He served in the Georgian parliament and as the Minister of Agriculture in the Democratic Republic of Georgia (1918–1921). Prior to that he introduced the order that led to the declaration of independence of the Transcaucasian Democratic Federative Republic on 22 April 1918. He was arrested in 1937 during the Great Purge and shot.

Notes

Bibliography

 
 

1883 births
1937 deaths
20th-century politicians from Georgia (country)
Democratic Republic of Georgia
Georgian independence activists
Mensheviks
People from Tiflis Governorate
Great Purge victims from Georgia (country)